Caixa is a mountain in the southern part of the island of São Vicente.It is situated 7 km south of the city centre of Mindelo.

See also
List of mountains in Cape Verde

References

Geography of São Vicente, Cape Verde
Mountains of Cape Verde